Donne may refer to:

People
Alfred François Donné (1801–1878), French bacteriologist and doctor
Daniel Donne (died 1617), English jurist
Elena Delle Donne (born 1989), American basketball player
Gabriel Donne (died 1558), English monk
Gaven Donne (1914–2010), New Zealand-born judge
George Donne (1605–1639), English soldier and writer, son of John Donne
John Donne (1572–1631), English poet and cleric in the Church of England
John Donne the Younger (1604–1662), English clergyman and writer, son of John Donne
Sir John Donne (c. 1420s – 1503), Welsh courtier, diplomat and soldier
Maria Dalle Donne (1778–1842), Italian physician
Mark Donne, London-based film-maker and writer
Raffaele Delle Donne (born 1967 or 1968), Italian-Canadian Mafia associate and informant
Robert Donne (born 1967), American musician and composer
Thomas Donne (1860–1945), New Zealand civil servant
William Bodham Donne (1807–1882), English journalist
William Donne (cricketer) (1875–1942), English cricket player
William Donne (priest) (1845–1914), British clergyman
Donne Trotter (born 1950), American politician
Donne Wall (born 1967), American basketball player
Jerome Dieu Donne Meyinsse (born 1988), American basketball player in the Israeli Basketball Premier League

Others
Donne (crater), a crater on Mercury
Donne River, a river in New Zealand

See also
Done (disambiguation)
Dun (disambiguation)
Dunn (disambiguation)
Dunne, a surname